Klaus Bondam (born 19 November 1963, in Aakirkeby) is a Danish actor and politician.

Acting career 
Bondam has been the manager two theatres,  (1996–2003) and Folketeatret (2003–2005), and been administrative manager of Mungo Park theatre (1995–1996).

Klaus Bondam began acting on stage in 1988. His acting breakthrough came in the movie Festen in 1998, playing the German toastmaster at the party. He starred in the series Langt fra Las Vegas (2001–2003) as the sexually driven boss Niels Buckingham.

Filmography

Film

Television

Politics 
Klaus Bondam was in the political party Radikale Venstre and ran for mayor of Copenhagen in November 2005. The party's city council representation grew from five to seven seats. This was not enough to secure the mayorship. He was instead named Mayor of the Technical and Environmental Committee. He resigned in 2010 and left the party in 2013. He is no longer active in Danish politics.

In 2011, Bondam was announced as the new head of the Danish Cultural Institute in Brussels, Belgium. In February 2014, he came back to Denmark and became the head of the Danish Cyclists' Federation.

Personal life 
Bondam is openly gay, he has entered into registered partnership with his partner, architect Jacob Camp since 2004, they married later and they live in Odsherred.

References

External links
 
 https://web.archive.org/web/20071226103220/http://www.bondam.dk/flx/v3/klaus/cv/
 Personal website

1963 births
Living people
People from Bornholm
Danish male film actors
Danish male television actors
Danish male stage actors
Gay politicians
Danish LGBT politicians
Danish gay actors
Danish Social Liberal Party politicians

21st-century Copenhagen City Council members